Meta Runner (known as Meta Runner: The Final Season for its third season) is an Australian adult computer-animated cyberpunk web series created by Kevin and Luke Lerdwichagul. It is produced by Glitch Productions, with production funding provided by Screen Australia, financed with support from Crunchyroll and AMD, and financed in association with Epic Games. It premiered on the YouTube channel SMG4 on July 25, 2019, with season 2 premiering on the channel GLITCH on October 16, 2020. A third and final season premiered on July 22, 2022.

The series takes place in a futuristic society where entertainment and lifestyle are based on video games and esports. This society has led to people who have replaced their limbs with cybernetic arms called "Meta Runners" to boost their gameplay performance. The series focuses on an amnesiac cyborg girl named Tari, who discovers that she has the ability to warp inside video games, and comes across and helps an undercover group called MD-5 in their mission to expose the corrupt company TASCorp.

A pilot for a spin-off show titled Ultra Jump Mania, based on the fictional video game of the same name in the show, was released on 4 September 2020.

Synopsis
In Silica City, all media and entertainment are mostly based around video games, not just serving as entertainment, but also jobs in live streaming and lifestyle. Among members of society are Meta Runners, individuals who have replaced their limbs with cybernetic arms that allow them to boost their gaming performance.

The series tells the story of Tari, a Meta Runner who was the subject of an experiment called Project Blue, led by Dr. Sheridan, a scientist who was commissioned by TASCorp. After waking up in an abandoned lab, Tari finds herself in Silica City with amnesia. The last thing Tari can remember is a sudden accident causing an explosion in the lab.

Voice cast and characters

Main characters

 Celeste Notley-Smith as Tari, the main protagonist of the entire series. She is a shy and insecure Meta Runner who has the ability to warp into the video games she plays. She also has an in-built AI that advises her on what actions to take while she is warped inside a video game. She is determined to find out who she is and where her unique abilities come from.
 Robyn Barry-Cotter (born Moore) as Theo, the goofy yet determined protagonist of the game Ultra Jump Mania, where he encounters Tari after she stumbles into his world. He gets transported to the real world via Tari's abilities.
 Hayley Nelson as Sofia Porter, a cheerful and upbeat girl who is one of Tari's friends. She is not known to play video games, but still helps MD-5 via her hacking skills.
 Anthony Sardinha as
 Lamar Williams, an easygoing otaku with a unique cybernetic arm and is a friend of Tari's.
 Dr. James Sheridan, the overarching main antagonist of the entire series and the main antagonist of Season 3. He is an ex-TASCorp scientist who created Project Blue to try to prevent Lucks from firing him. He is presumed missing alongside Lucinia after an explosion while developing Project Blue.
 Brendan Barry-Cotter as Masa Shimamoto, a calm, composed, and serious friend of Tari but is a former team captain for TASCorp. He was decommissioned after trying to hack into Lucks’ private server to prove his theory that Lucks killed Lucinia.
 Jessica Fallico as Belle Fontiere, the secondary antagonist of season 1, an anti-heroine of season 2 and 3 a rival of Tari. She is also a representative of TASCorp and their most celebrated Meta Runner. She is Lucinia's girlfriend, but after finding out about her apparent death, she begins to disobey her boss and act on her own accord.
 David J.G. Doyle as Derek Lucks, the main antagonist of seasons 1 and 2, and the arch-nemesis of Masa. He was the CEO of TAS Corp who was obsessed with Tari, due to her unexpected ability to warp into video games. He tried to capture Tari in order to discover the cause of her ability and give it to his other Meta Runners so that TAS Corp surpasses their competition. He was fatally shot at the end of season 2 after Sheridan hacked Masa's cybernetic arm. An AI version of Lucks appears as a recurring character in the 3rd season.
 Elsie Lovelock as Evelyn Claythorne, the secondary antagonist of seasons 2 and 3 and a Meta Runner at TASCorp., is shown to be extremely snobby, selfish, and whiny throughout her appearances in the show. She is also forced to be Tari's show match partner, even though she heavily resents Tari for stealing her spotlight.
 Amber Lee Connors as Lucinia Porter, the overarching protagonist of the entire series. She was a Meta Runner at TASCorp, and was the human test subject for Dr. Sheridan's “Project Blue”. She was presumed missing after the "Project Blue" test ended with an explosion. She is the sister of Sofia Porter, the A.I. fragment of Tari, and the girlfriend of Belle Fontiere.

Minor characters

 Jason Marnocha as Marco, a host of underground gaming tournaments in the slums of Silica City. He collects Meta Runner arms and uses two of them as additional limbs.
 Elsie Lovelock as Bo, a minor character who serves as the mascot of TASCorp. She only appears on Silica City billboards.
 Kevin and Luke Lerdwichagul as the Bot-boys, common robots found across Silica City, usually with a job or function. One is also shown to be in the game Ultra Jump Mania.
 David J.G. Doyle as Elder Tomato, a character in the video game Ultra Jump Mania. His purpose in the game is to give the player expositionary information and advice. He is also a supporting character of the spinoff series Ultra Jump Mania.
 Amber Lee Connors as Satsuki-chan, a character from the dating simulation game Nova Explorers. She appears in the handheld dating simulation game Pocket Gakusei due to a crossover between the two games.
 Brendan Blaber as Petey, an NPC and a tutorial guide from Skybreakers.

Guest stars
 Elliott "Muselk" Watkins as Announcer
 James Rallison as Male Civilian and himself
 Kathleen Belsten as Female Civilian
 Ross O'Donovan as Announcer
 Brodey Rogan "Bazza Gazza" de Meur as Tempest Competitor 1
 Nathan "Crayator" Clifford as Tempest Competitor 2
 Kizuna AI as herself 
 Arin Hanson as himself

History and production
As revealed in a video titled "The Making of Tari" uploaded by Luke and Kevin Lerdwichagul on 14 February 2019, the concept of Tari's character started when Kevin and Luke asked their younger sister, Tish, who was drawing in her sketchbook, if she had any ideas for a new character to add to their channel's titular machinima series; she drew a “gamer girl” character who would become Tari. The first early design of Tari was for her to be a robot instead of a cyborg, an antenna on top of her head, headphones, a simple jacket with a love heart stitched onto it and a d-pad for her right eye.

Eventually, Tari was redesigned as a human cyborg with a white vest with the Meta Runner emblem, which was based on the blue jay’s wing. She was also given a blue hoodie with blue jay wing patterns on each shoulder starting from "Sequence Break" (episode 4).

Meta Runner was first teased at the end of the SMG4 episode, "War of the Fat Italians 2018", depicting the character Theo and the date 5 December 2018. The months following had similar teasers of different Meta Runner arms before the official trailer for Meta Runner was uploaded on 5 December 2018.

On 18 March 2019, it was announced that Meta Runner was one of many projects to receive funding from a $500,000 grant from Unreal Engine. On 25 June 2019, it was announced that Meta Runner would be funded by Screen Australia, Epic Games and AMD. On 20 July 2019, Glitch Productions announced that they had partnered with Crunchyroll to produce the series. On 20 April 2020, Screen Australia announced the funding of Meta Runner season 2. The second season aired from 16 October to 18 December 2020.

A third season was announced by the creator Luke Lerdwichagul a few weeks before season 2 was completed, before being formally announced on November 29, 2021. A teaser trailer was released on May 6, 2022. The teaser confirmed that the third season will be the final season and will be released the summer of the same year.

On June 24, 2022, the official trailer for Season 3 was released, confirming it would begin on July 22, 2022. It ended on September 9, 2022.

Comic
After the finale on September 9, 2022, a comic series, entitled "Meta Runner: Source" was announced, appearing to go through the backstory of Lucinia Porter. It was also promoted through a pre-video announcement for the third episode of SMG4's Lawsuit Arc "SMG4: If Mario Was In... Splatoon 3", released on September 10. A trailer dedicated to the comic was released on September 11 on the GLITCH channel.

Episodes

Season 1 (2019)

Season 2 (2020)

Season 3 (2022)

References

External links
 Official website
 

2019 web series debuts
2022 web series endings
2010s YouTube series
2020s YouTube series
Animated science fiction web series
Australian animated web series
Australian adult animated web series
Anime-influenced Western animated television series
Web series about robots
Web series about cyborgs
LGBT-related animated web series
LGBT speculative fiction television series